Encores is a live extended play (EP) by British rock band Dire Straits, released on 10 May 1993, shortly after the release of their live album, On the Night. Although it was an EP, it charted on the singles charts of several countries, including France, Portugal, and Spain, where it debuted at number one in all three countries.

Track listings
All songs were written by Mark Knopfler.
 "Your Latest Trick" – 5:41
 "The Bug" – 5:24
 "Solid Rock" – 5:20
 "Local Hero (Wild Theme)" – 4:19

Charts

Weekly charts

Year-end charts

References

1993 EPs
1993 live albums
Albums produced by Guy Fletcher
Albums produced by Mark Knopfler
Dire Straits albums
Live EPs
Number-one singles in Portugal
Number-one singles in Spain
SNEP Top Singles number-one singles
Songs written by Mark Knopfler
Vertigo Records EPs
Vertigo Records live albums